Vysotsky. Thank You for Being Alive is a 2011 Russian drama film about Vladimir Vysotsky based on a screenplay by his son Nikita and directed by Pyotr Buslov. The primary actor, who played the role of Vysotsky, went uncredited and remained unknown to public. Later, it was revealed that CGI and heavy makeup disguised Sergey Bezrukov. The film premiered on December 1, 2011.

Plot summary 
Film is based on a true story about a Vysotsky concert tour to Uzbekistan and subsequent clinical death in 1979.

Cast 
 Sergey Bezrukov as Vladimir Vysotsky (uncredited), also appearing as Yura, colleague of Vysotsky.
 Nikita Vysotsky as Vladimir Vysotsky's voice
 Oksana Akinshina as Tatiana Ivleva, girlfriend of Vysotsky
 Andrey Smolyakov as Viktor Bekhteev, KGB Colonel in Uzbekistan
 Ivan Urgant as Seva Kulagin, friend of Vysotsky
 Maxim Leonidov as Pavel Leonidov, manager and friend of Vysotsky
 Vladimir Ilyin as KGB Colonel from Moscow
 Andrei Panin as Anatoly Nefedov, personal doctor of Vysotsky
 Dmitry Astrakhan as Leonid Fridman, concert manager in Uzbekistan, who invited Vysotsky
 Anna Ardova as Isabella Yurievna, Director of the House of Culture of Uzbekistan
 Vladimir Menshov as Taganka Theater stage director (portrayed Yury Lyubimov)
 Alla Pokrovskaya as Nina Maksimovna, mother of Vladimir Vysotsky
 Sergey Shakurov as Semyon Vladimirovich, father of Vladimir Vysotsky

Production 

 The actor who played Vysotsky spent 4 – 6 hours every day for make-up and about 1 - 1.5 hours to undo the make-up. In some sets Vysotsky was "reconstructed" for the film with the use of CGI.
 In spring 2012 Sergey Bezrukov admitted in a TV talk show that he in fact was the actor who played the role of Vladimir Vysotsky. Also, for the extended TV version released in January 2013, Bezrukov was credited for the role of Vysotsky.

Reception
The film received mixed reviews, with many criticizing the decision to have the actor portraying Vysotsky to wear a mask. Also Vysotsky's last wife Marina Vlady has commented negatively on the film, saying that the film is "An insult to Vysotsky, his art, his memory and our life together".

References

External links 
 
 'Vysotsky' Becomes Russia's Highest Grossing Movie of 2011 by Vladimir Kozlov at The Hollywood Reporter
 Movie fails to capture life of legendary Vysotsky by Olga Rudenko for Kyiv Post, December 1, 2011

Vladimir Vysotsky
2011 films
2011 biographical drama films
Russian biographical drama films
Biographical films about singers
Cultural depictions of Russian men
Cultural depictions of rock musicians
Films set in 1979
Films set in Uzbekistan
Film controversies in Russia
2011 drama films